Kro or KRO may refer to:

, Dutch public broadcasting organization
Kro (comics), character from the Marvel Comics, also known as Warlord Kro
IATA code for Kurgan Airport
ISO code for Kru languages

See also
Cro (disambiguation)
Kru (disambiguation)